Simha Erlich (15 December 1915 – 19 June 1983) was an Israeli politician. He was the leader of the Liberal Party and Minister of Finance under Menachem Begin, and is known for his attempt to liberalize the Israeli economy.

Biography
Erlich was born in 1915 in Bachów, Kingdom of Galicia and Lodomeria, Austria-Hungary, today Poland, and was a member of the General Zionists youth movement. He immigrated to Mandatory Palestine in 1938 and worked as a farmer in Nes Ziona. He studied optics and founded a lens factory. In 1955 he was elected to Tel Aviv city council, and became a member of the Liberal Party. In 1969 he quit the city council and was elected to the Knesset on the Gahal list (Gahal being a coalition between the Liberal Party and Herut). In 1976 he was elected chairman of the Liberal Party.

After the 1977 elections he was appointed Finance Minister and Deputy Prime Minister. As Minister of Finance he tried to cause an economic upheaval in Israel by abolishing foreign currency regulations and travel tax, as well as cheapening imported goods. It soon turned out that Israel's economy was not prepared for such a drastic change, as could be seen by the subsequent deterioration of the balance of payments, the mass increase of goods import and sharp rise of inflation rate. Consequently, Erlich was forced to resign as Minister of Finance, but remained Deputy Prime Minister and was in charge of the development of the Galilee, the Arab sector and re-absorption of emigrants.

After the 1981 elections Erlich was appointed Agriculture Minister and remained Deputy Prime Minister. He died in 1983.

References

External links

1915 births
1983 deaths
People from Przemyśl County
People from the Kingdom of Galicia and Lodomeria
Jews from Galicia (Eastern Europe)
Polish emigrants to Mandatory Palestine
Gahal politicians
Likud politicians
Liberal Party (Israel) leaders
General Zionists politicians
Ministers of Agriculture of Israel
Ministers of Finance of Israel
Members of the 7th Knesset (1969–1974)
Members of the 8th Knesset (1974–1977)
Members of the 9th Knesset (1977–1981)
Members of the 10th Knesset (1981–1984)